Grafenort may refer to:

 The German name for the village of Gorzanów, in Kłodzko County, Lower Silesian Voivodeship, Poland
 The settlement of Grafenort (Engelberg), in the municipality of Engelberg in the Swiss canton of Obwalden